He Died Fifteen Years Ago (Spanish: Murió hace quince años) is a 1954 Spanish drama film directed by Rafael Gil and starring Rafael Rivelles, Francisco Rabal and Lyla Rocco.

Synopsis 
Diego Acuña was one of the children transferred to the Soviet Union during the Spanish Civil War and educated in communism and prepared to act as an international spy. Among his destinations are France and Italy, where he will work under the command of Germán Goeritz. After several years he is entrusted with a mission in Spain, in which he must collaborate in the murder of his father, an important opponent of communism.

Cast
 Rafael Rivelles as Coronel Acuña 
 Francisco Rabal as Diego 
 Lyla Rocco as Mónica 
 Gérard Tichy as Germán Goeritz  
 Carmen Rodríguez as Cándida  
 Ricardo Calvo as Daniel 
 Fernando Sancho as Joaquín Campos  
 Félix de Pomés as Jefe de policía  
 Antonio Prieto as Ramón Iranzo  
 José Manuel Martín as Muñoz  
 Porfiria Sanchíz as Profesora  
 Carlos Acevedo as Diego, de niño  
 María Dolores Pradera as Cantante 
 Maria Piazzai as Irene 
 Gabriel Alcover as Primer agente en El Escorial  
 Juan José Alcón as Diego, de joven  
 Adela Carboné as Vieja  
 Álvarez de Quindós as Doctor  
 Ramón D. Faraldo as Professor  
 Rufino Inglés as Segundo agente en El Escorial 
 Damián Rabal as Marinero 
 Pedro Luis Ramírez as Viajero del avión  
 Luis Rivera as Maitre  
 Jacinto San Emeterio as Agente del aeropuerto 
 Carlos Miguel Solá as Agente en el caserón

References

Bibliography 
 Bentley, Bernard. A Companion to Spanish Cinema. Boydell & Brewer 2008.

External links 
 

1954 drama films
Spanish drama films
1954 films
1950s Spanish-language films
Films directed by Rafael Gil
Suevia Films films
Films produced by Cesáreo González
Spanish black-and-white films
1950s Spanish films